The New Jersey Naval Militia (NJNM) is the inactive naval militia of the state of New Jersey. As a portion of the New Jersey organized militia, it existed as an active entity from 1895 to 1963 and again from 1999 to 2002. The Naval Militia was stood down by the state in 2002 due to a concerns about training, accession processes, security clearances, background checks, rank criteria, medical standards, physical fitness criteria, vessel fitness, and command qualifications.

Since 2002, a group of dedicated volunteers and former members have been lobbying to have the New Jersey Naval Militia funded and returned to duty. In support of the NJ Naval Militia's return, the non-profit New Jersey Naval Militia Foundation was established.

After 2002, the duties performed by the Naval Militia were absorbed by civilian agencies, volunteer groups, the New Jersey National Guard, and law enforcement agencies on the local, state, and federal level. In 2005, the New Jersey Adjutant General reported to the state legislature that the Naval Militia no longer had a defined mission to justify support or funding from the state. In March 2005, the New Jersey State Police issued a memorandum which cited issues that would preclude their support for the NJNM.

As a naval militia, the NJNM was partially regulated and equipped by the federal government, but served as a reserve force under the control of the State of New Jersey. Naval militias are authorized and regulated by federal law under Title 32 of the United States Code. New Jersey law also allows for the state to maintain a naval militia. As it was under state jurisdiction, the Governor of New Jersey was the Commander-in-chief of the NJNM.

History
The New Jersey Naval Militia was originally called the Naval Reserve of New Jersey. Founded in 1895, with the purpose of protecting the coast, harbors, and waterfront property. After the passage of the Federal Naval Reserve Law of 1916, the name was changed to the Naval Militia of New Jersey. The NJNM first saw combat during the Spanish–American War, and also fought in the World War I and World War II. After reaching a peak strength of 3,590 during the Korean War, the NJNM was absorbed by the United States Naval Reserve in 1963, after which it ceased to exist as an independent organization.

In 1999, the NJNM was reorganized by Governor Christine Todd-Whitman to better integrate the NJNM with the New Jersey State Guard.

In April 2002, the NJNM was stood down by the Adjutant General due to organizational and personnel issues.

Notable Missions Post-9/11
After the attacks of September 11, 2001 the NJNM was called to State Active Duty (SAD) to assist in recovery, including a deployment of the NJNM's Disaster Medical Assistance Team and the Chaplain Corps to Staten Island, and the ferrying of evidence collected from Ground Zero to Manhattan's Chelsea Pier and Staten Island. The NJNM also took part in Operation Noble Eagle. As a naval militia, in the aftermath of the attacks of 9/11, the NJNM supported homeland security operations and disaster recovery. Missions conducted by the NJNM between September 11, 2001, and 2002 include:
 Waterborne security at the bases of the George Washington Bridge
 Daylight vessel traffic control on the Hudson River, north of the George Washington Bridge
 Standby vessel for search and rescue detail Coast Guard Station Sandy Hook, NJ
 Transport of military personnel and equipment from NJ to North Cove (Ground Zero)
 V.I.P. transportation and security detail for Liberty State Park tribute events during October 2001
 192 days of water-borne security assisting naval personnel at Naval Weapons Station Earle
 180 days of continuous daylight patrols assisting the NJ State Police at Salem Nuclear Generating Station, Salem, NJ
 Assisted with security in Jamaica Bay, NY during the aftermath of the crash of Flight 194, Kennedy Airport

Organization
The NJNM was originally organized at a brigade level. By 1912, the NJNM was organized into two brigades, consisting of 346 members, and different ships loaned by the federal government: the monitor U.S.S. Ajax in 1898, and the vessels USS Vixen, USS Adams, and USS Marietta.

During its activation from 1999 to 2002, the New Jersey Naval Militia was combined with the inactive New Jersey State Guard to form the New Jersey Naval Militia Joint Command, which was divided into three battalions.

By assigning civilian members and military reservists into different battalions, the naval militia was able to meet the requirement that 95% of a naval militia be composed of Navy, Marine, and Coast Guard reservists in order to receive federal aid. This was accomplished by having the first battalion being composed solely of Navy, Marine, and Coast Guard reservists in order to receive access to federal support and Navy and Marine Corps facilities. The second battalion was organized as an operational Naval State Guard, composed largely of former service members, with the 3rd Division providing support and auxiliary functions. By only seeking federal recognition for the first battalion as a naval militia, and considering the other two as divisions of the New Jersey State Guard, the NJNM was structured to receive federal aid while including civilian members.

Equipment
In 1999, the NJNM had maintained eight boats donated by the city of Linden, the U.S. Coast Guard and the New Jersey State Police.

After deactivation in 2002, the NJ Naval Militia vessels were placed into caretaker status and maintained by volunteers in anticipation for future reactivation. Volunteers continued to maintain four 23 foot Monarch aluminum patrol boats, and a former Navy 24 foot diesel powered aluminum patrol boat.

As of 2022, 20 years since deactivation, the remaining vessels of the New Jersey Naval Militia are maintained in caretaker status by the New Jersey Naval Militia Foundation. The vessels are stored by the foundation at the Princeton Armory in New Jersey.

See also

 United States Coast Guard Auxiliary
 United States Coast Guard
 United States Naval Sea Cadet Corps
 New Jersey Wing Civil Air Patrol
 United States Power Squadrons
 New Jersey National Guard
 Port Authority of New York and New Jersey Police Department
 National Guard Militia Museum of New Jersey
 New Jersey State Guard
 New York Naval Militia

References

Military in New Jersey
State defense forces of the United States